This is a list of properties and districts in Heard County, Georgia that are listed on the National Register of Historic Places (NRHP).

Current listings

|}

References

Heard
Buildings and structures in Heard County, Georgia